Gary John Martin (born 10 October 1990) is an English professional footballer who plays as a striker for Icelandic club Selfoss. Besides England, he has played in Hungary, Iceland, Belgium and Norway.

Career
Martin was born in Darlington, County Durham. He started his career with Middlesbrough, where he came through the club's youth system and was given a youth-team scholarship (YTS) in 2007. He was a prolific goalscorer at both youth and reserve levels, scoring 19 goals in 39 matches for the academy team, and 17 goals in 26 appearances for the reserve team. In June 2009, his YTS was extended by a year, and in the build-up to the 2009–10 season he played with the first team in pre-season. On 23 February 2010, Martin joined Nemzeti Bajnokság I club Újpest on loan until the end of the season. He went on to make two league appearances during his spell with Újpest, coming on as a substitute in a 4–1 home win against Diósgyőr and a 1–0 defeat away to Lombard-Pápa.

After being released by Middlesbrough in May 2010, Martin signed for 1. deild karla club ÍA on 23 July 2010, initially on a short-term contract to the end of the season. He made his debut five days later, coming on as a 54th-minute substitute for Stefán Örn Arnarson in the 1–1 draw with Fjölnir, and scored his first goal for the club two weeks later in a 2–2 draw away to Þór Akureyri. Martin joined Danish 1st Division club Hjørring on loan in August 2011, making seven appearances before the club decided to not extend his loan in November.

After two successful seasons, Martin signed for Úrvalsdeild champions KR for a nominal fee. In the 2013 season, KR again won the Úrvalsdeild title, with Martin being joint top scorer in the league with 13 goals. He was named the best foreign player in the league and was selected in the Team of the Year. During the season, Martin also made his first appearance in the UEFA Europa League, scoring his first goal in that competition against Glentoran. He was the Úrvalsdeild top scorer in the 2014 season with 13 goals.

Martin signed for KR's Úrvalsdeild rivals Víkingur Reykjavík on 15 February 2016 on a three-year contract. On 10 August 2016, he signed for Tippeligaen club Lillestrøm on loan for the remainder of the 2016 season, joining up with his former coach at KR, Rúnar Kristinsson. He returned to Víkingur Reykjavík in January 2017.

Martin signed for Belgian First Division A club Lokeren on 16 January 2017 on a two-and-a-half-year contract, where he again joined up with his former manager Rúnar Kristinsson. Having not played at the beginning of the 2017–18 season, Martin was released on 18 October 2017.

On 24 October 2017, Martin signed a three-year contract to return to Lillestrøm, effective from 1 January 2018. He signed for National League North club York City on 2 November 2017 on a short-term contract, playing for them in the interim period before his transfer to Lillestrøm. He made his debut two days later in York's 2–1 home win over Curzon Ashton, in which he provided an assist for Jon Parkin to score the opening goal. Martin scored his first goal in his fourth appearance, a 3–1 home victory over Coalville Town in the FA Trophy third qualifying round on 25 November 2017. He scored the opening goal of the match, with a curling shot from the edge of the penalty area into the top-left corner. Martin left the club two days later, because of what York described as a disciplinary issue. It was reported in The Press that the club had discovered that he had been playing for Darlington Albion in the Darlington Sunday Morning Invitation League.

Martin signed for Úrvalsdeild champions Valur on 7 January 2019 on a three-year contract. However, after five months with Valur, he left the club to join fellow Úrvalsdeild club ÍBV. He finished as top scorer in the 2019 Úrvalsdeild, with 14 goals for Valur and ÍBV combined. Martin signed for his home-town club, Darlington of the National League North, on 11 January 2020 on loan until late March. In April 2021, ÍBV terminated its contract with Martin after a teammate of his charged him to the police for posting a nude picture of him in a closed Snapchat group. On 1 May, he signed with 1. deild karla club Selfoss.

Career statistics

Honours
ÍA
1. deild karla: 2011

KR
Úrvalsdeild: 2013
Icelandic Cup: 2012, 2014
Icelandic Super Cup: 2014

References

External links

1990 births
Living people
Footballers from Darlington
English footballers
Association football forwards
Middlesbrough F.C. players
Újpest FC players
Gary Martin
Vendsyssel FF players
Knattspyrnufélag Reykjavíkur players
Knattspyrnufélagið Víkingur players
Lillestrøm SK players
K.S.C. Lokeren Oost-Vlaanderen players
York City F.C. players
Valur (men's football) players
Íþróttabandalag Vestmannaeyja players
Darlington F.C. players
Selfoss men's football players
Nemzeti Bajnokság I players
1. deild karla players
Danish 1st Division players
Úrvalsdeild karla (football) players
Eliteserien players
Belgian Pro League players
National League (English football) players
English expatriate footballers
Expatriate footballers in Belgium
Expatriate men's footballers in Denmark
Expatriate footballers in Hungary
Expatriate footballers in Iceland
Expatriate footballers in Norway
English expatriate sportspeople in Belgium
English expatriate sportspeople in Denmark
English expatriate sportspeople in Hungary
English expatriate sportspeople in Iceland
English expatriate sportspeople in Norway